Narrow Gauge Down Under is an Australian magazine that covers narrow-gauge prototype and model railways. The headquarters is in Clifton Hill, Victoria.

The magazine was first published in 1996, and is published 4 times per year.

Parameters 
 Coverage  : Modelling & some International
 Size      : A4
 Publisher : Gavin & Louise Hince
 
 Issue     : Number 39 is October 2010

See also
 List of railroad-related periodicals

References

External links
 Narrow Gauge Down Under Homepage

1996 establishments in Australia
Quarterly magazines published in Australia
Rail transport magazines published in Australia
Magazines established in 1996
Magazines published in Melbourne